"After the Lights Go Out" is a country music song written by Warner Mack (credited to his real name, Warner McPherson) and originally released in 1973. It was later re-recorded by American country music singer Ricky Van Shelton. It was released in November 1991 as the third single from his album Backroads.  The song peaked at #13 on the U.S. country chart and at #8 in Canada.

Chart positions

Year-end charts

References

1991 singles
Warner Mack songs
Ricky Van Shelton songs
Songs written by Warner Mack
Song recordings produced by Steve Buckingham (record producer)
Columbia Nashville Records singles
1973 songs